Schottenheimer is a surname. Notable people with the surname include:

 Brian Schottenheimer (born 1973), American football coach
 Kurt Schottenheimer (born 1949), American football player and coach
 Marty Schottenheimer (1943–2021), American football player and coach